Suno Chanda 2 is a 2019 Pakistani romantic comedy television series produced by Momina Duraid under their production banner MD Productions. It is a sequel to the 2018 series Suno Chanda. It is directed by Ahson Talish and written by Saima Akram Chaudhry. The first episode of the series was aired  on 7 May 2019. In this sequel, Farhan Saeed and Iqra Aziz reprise their roles as Arsal and Ajiya respectively. It also focuses on story of Mithu and Maina played by Raza Talish and Sabeena Farooq respectively. The serial became a sleeper hit in Pakistan, India and the United Kingdom.

Premise
This season continues from where the first season ended. The series explores the story of Jiya (Iqra Aziz) and Arsal (Farhan Saeed) after their marriage and also focuses on the marriage ceremonies of Sherry (Nabeel Zuberi) with Kinza (Mashal Khan) and Billo (Mizna Waqas) with Joji (Ali Safina). They had realised their love for each other during the last season. It also has new characters Mithu (Raza Talish), who is the son of Shahana's cousin Pari (Arjumand Rahim) and Jalal's niece Maina (Sabeena Farooq), both start liking each other and after a little family drama tied the knot, too.

Cast and characters
Iqra Aziz as Ajiya aka Jiya Arsal Ali; Arsal's wife. Apple of the family's eye, stubborn, has a dream of going to UK for higher studies.
Farhan Saeed as Arsalan aka Arsal Jamshed Ali; Son of Jamshed Ali and Shahana, Jiya's husband. He has always loved Jiya from heart, however due to minor differences, they always end up fighting.
Raza Talish as Subugtageen Aka Mithoo; Arsal's cousin, Pari's son and Shahana's nephew. An obedient son and electrical "engineer" by profession, Maina's Love Interest, then her husband.
Sabeena Farooq as Romaina Khan aka Maina; Kinza's cousin and Love Interest of Mithoo, then her wife. Lives in Peshawar. Only sister of six brothers. She has come to Karachi to take admission in Masters in Urdu literature/اردو ادب.
Nabeel Zuberi as Shehryar aka Sherry; Jiya and Arsals cousin, Agha Jan's grandson, lives in London, but came to Karachi to attend Arsal and Jiya's wedding, Kinza's husband.
Mashal Khan as Kinza Jalal Khan/Kinza Sheheryar ; Jiya and Arsal's cousin, Sherry's wife. She along with Sherry moved to London after their marriage.
Samina Ahmed as Mumtaz Begam; Bi Jaan, Jia and Arsal's grandmother. Matriarch of the family. She always brings together all house members to her room for discussing house matters.
Syed Mohammad Ahmed as Shah Jahan; Agha Jaan, Shehryar's grandfather. He has his own business in London which Sherry handles.
Mizna Waqas as Arbela (Billo); old flame of Jamshed Ali. Joji's wife.
Ali Safina as Chaudhary Jawad aka Joji; Shahana's cousin, Billo's husband.
Farhan Ali Agha as Jamshed Ali, Arsal's father, is worried about Arsal's future due to his lack of interest in the factory work. Shahana's Husband.
Nadia Afgan as Shahana aka Shanno/Channo; Jamshed's wife, Arsal's mother. Most appreciated character by the audience.
Sohail Sameer as Nazakat Ali, Jiya's father. A hypochondriac with a box of all kind of medicines and always act like Patient. Naeema's Husband.
Farah Shah as Naeema; Nazakat's wife, Jiya's mother, always angry on Jiya due to Jiya's aggressive behaviour towards Arsal.
Adnan Shah Tipu as Jalal Khan, Jiya and Arsal's uncle. Kinza's father. Flirts with Pari. Lives in Peshawar, he came to Karachi to attend Arsal and Jiya's wedding but decided to stay at Mumtaz house due to financial issues.
Tara Mahmood as Masooma; Jalal's wife, Kinza's mother, Arsal and Jiya's aunt. She is considered most innocent person in the house.
Arjumand Rahim as Parveen Mughal aka Pari, aka Peeno/bebe; Joji and Shahana's cousin. Old flame of Nazakat Ali. Still has feelings for him. Mitthu's mother. Clever and quick witted woman. 
Fareeha Jabeen as Nagina Chachi; Joji's mother. Hitting on Agha Jaan. Bi Jaan feels hatred towards her due to her closeness with Agha Jaan.
Sami Khan as Daniyal (DJ); Jiya's younger brother. Expert in sting operations and making videos/spying.
Beena Chaudhary as Zarmeen Gul; Maina's mother, Jalal's sister, she arrives at Mumtaz House to take back Maina to Peshawar but finally got agreed to Mithu's proposal for Maina.
Anumta Qureshi as Huma; Jiya's friend, Mithu's first love interest before Maina's arrival at Mumtaz house.
Hamza Khan as Yasir; Arsal's friend, he later helped arsal to normalize his relation with Jiya.
Raja Haider as Daaji; Jalal and Zarmeen Guls father the grandfather of Maina

Production
In 2018, it was reported that Suno Chanda will have a sequel. Iqra Aziz confirmed being part of the Season. On 2 October 2018, it was reported that Farhan Saeed had signed up for the project opposite Aziz. On 10 October, it was reported that Nabeel Zuberi had also signed up.

Like previous season, this season also introduces some debutants including Raza Abbas Talish, son of director Ahson Talish. The first teaser was released on 22 April 2019. It aired in May 2019 during Ramadan. The first episode of the mini series was aired on 7 May 2019.

Episodes

Soundtrack

Music is composed by Naveed Nashad, lyrics are by Aehsun Talish.

Original serial versions

Reception

The initial response to the series was good, it has been termed as a lighthearted sitcom. Maria Kari of the Dawn says, "after a long day of work, school or fasting we want some lighthearted, mindless, comic relief." In positive response to the series, the cast including Aziz and Zuberi feature in OPPO's F11 TVC. Reviewer from The Express Tribune called the TVC, along with the series a double treat for the audience. The rating of Suno Chanda 2 (blockbuster) made a huge response in UK. According to BizAsia, the first episode of the series was watched by 84,600 viewers at 21:15 – peaking at 94,300 viewers. This was followed by another Hum TV serial Bharam with 33,300 viewers and Geo Entertainment's Siraat-e-Mustaqeem with 23,900 viewers. The daily prime time night slot of the series on the channel is proving a success for the channel.

Sequel
It has been reported earlier that a sequel Suno Chanda 3, the third installment in the Suno Chanda series, will be made, however in an interview, Nadia Afgan denied and said "The Suno Chanda series will not be back and writer Saima Akram is writing something new for next Ramadan".

References

External links

Official website 

Hum TV original programming
2019 Pakistani television series debuts
Pakistani drama television series
Ramadan special television shows